Ruan Yuan (1764–1849), courtesy name Yuntai (云台), was a Chinese historian, politician, and writer of the Qing Dynasty who was the most prominent Chinese scholar during the first half of the 19th century.  He won the jinshi degree in the imperial examinations in 1789 and was subsequently appointed to the Hanlin Academy. He was known for his work Biographies of Astronomers and Mathematicians and for his editing the Shisan Jing Zhushu (Commentaries and Notes on the Thirteen Classics) for the Qing emperor.

Ruan Yuan was a successful official as well as a scholar. He was the Viceroy of Liangguang, the most important imperial official in Canton (Guangzhou), during the critical years 1817–1826, just before the First Opium War with Britain. It was a crucial time when Chinese trade with the outside world was allowed only through the Canton System, with all foreigners confined to Canton, the capital of Guangdong Province. During his tenure in Canton, Ruan is estimated to have earned more than 195,000 taels of silver.

He was widely recognized as an official, scholar, and patron of learning both by his contemporaries and by modern scholars. He was also praised as an honest official and an exemplary man of the ‘Confucian persuasion’. His name is mentioned in almost all works on Qing history or Chinese classics because of the wide range of his research and publications. A number of these publications are still reprinted. Ruan Yuan was a follower of the Han Learning tradition and as such, with the encouragement of Liu Fenglu, he edited and organized publication of the compendium of the imperial achievements in kaozheng scholarship, the Huang Qing Jingjie (皇清经解) published in 1829.

Kong Luhua (relative of the Duke Yansheng) was the second wife of Ruan Yuan.

References

Bibliography

External links
 Ruan Yuan biography from St. Andrews University

1764 births
1849 deaths
19th-century Chinese historians
Assistant Grand Secretaries
Chinese Confucianists
Grand Secretaries of the Qing dynasty
Historians from Jiangsu
Historians of astronomy
Historians of mathematics
Qing dynasty historians
Qing dynasty politicians from Jiangsu
Politicians from Yangzhou
Viceroys of Huguang
Viceroys of Liangguang
Viceroys of Yun-Gui
Writers from Yangzhou
Qing dynasty classicists